Nicholas Saul (1833 – January 28, 1853) was a prominent nineteenth-century criminal and one of the founding members of the Daybreak Boys, a New York City street gang. Saul led many of the gang’s early raids, many of which were before sunrise— earning the gang their nickname—on the Hudson River and East River waterfront. At its height during 1851 to 1853, the gang earned an estimated $200,000 under Saul's leadership.

See also
 Capital punishment in New York (state)
 Capital punishment in the United States
 List of people executed in New York

Further reading
Asbury, Herbert. The Gangs of New York. New York: Alfred A. Knopf, 1928; 
Sifakis, Carl. The Encyclopedia of American Crime. New York: Facts on File Inc., 2001;

External links
 https://query.nytimes.com/gst/abstract.html?res=9E04E3DE153EE13AA15757C2A9679C946292D7CF

1833 births
1853 deaths
19th-century executions by New York (state)
Gang members of New York City
American people convicted of murder
People executed for murder
19th-century executions by the United States
People executed by New York (state) by hanging
19th-century executions of American people
People convicted of murder by New York (state)
Date of birth unknown
1852 murders in the United States